Sébastien Loeb Racing is a French racing team, founded by rally and racing driver Sébastien Loeb. It currently competes in the World Rallycross Championship, World Touring Car Cup, Porsche Carrera Cup France, and 208 Rally Cup. The team used to race in the World Touring Car Championship from 2015 to 2017.

Racing record 

{|class="wikitable collapsible collapsed"
! Season
! Championship
! Drivers
! Car
|-
! rowspan=16| 2012
| rowspan=6| Porsche Carrera Cup France
|  Jean-Karl Vernay
| rowspan=6| Porsche 997 GT3 Cup
|-
|  Sébastien Loeb
|-
|  Nicolas Marroc
|-
|  Sacha Bottemanne
|-
|  Vincent Beltoise
|-
|  Christophe Lapierre
|-
| rowspan=6| Championnat de France FFSA GT
|  Sébastien Loeb
| rowspan=2| McLaren MP4-12C GT3
|-
| rowspan=2|  Gilles Vannelet
|-
| rowspan=4| Mercedes-Benz SLS AMG GT3
|-
|  Nicolas Marroc
|-
|  Frédéric Gabillon
|-
|  Nicolas Tardif
|-
| rowspan=3| European Le Mans Series 
|  Stéphane Sarrazin
| rowspan=3| Oreca 03 Nissan
|-
|  Nicolas Marroc
|-
|  Nicolas Minassian
|-
| Mitjet 2L Supersport
|  Sébastien Loeb
| Tork Mitjet 2.0 Renault
|-
! rowspan=19| 2013
| rowspan=5| Porsche Carrera Cup France
|  Côme Ledogar
| rowspan=5| Porsche 997 GT3 Cup
|-
|  Maxime Jousse
|-
|  Christian Bottemanne
|-
|  Sacha Bottemanne
|-
|  Christophe Lapierre
|-
| rowspan=6| Championnat de France FFSA GT
|  Anthony Beltoise
| rowspan=10| McLaren MP4-12C GT3
|-
|  Laurent Pasquali
|-
|  Nicolas Marroc
|-
|  Nicolas Tardif
|-
|  Christophe Lapierre
|-
| rowspan=2|  Sébastien Loeb
|-
| rowspan=4| FIA GT Series
|-
|  Alvaro Parente
|-
|  Mike Parisy
|-
|  Andreas Zuber
|-
| rowspan=4| Mitjet 2L Supersport
|  Sébastien Loeb
| rowspan=4| Tork Mitjet 2.0 Renault
|-
|  Steve Maire
|-
|  Dominique Rebout
|-
|  Frédéric Willmann
|-
! rowspan=16| 2014
| rowspan=6| Porsche Carrera Cup France
|  Nicolas Marroc
| rowspan=6| Porsche 991 GT3 Cup
|-
|  Maxime Jousse
|-
|  Joffrey de Narda
|-
|  Sacha Bottemanne
|-
|  Christophe Lapierre
|-
|  Roar Lindland
|-
|rowspan=4| Championnat de France FFSA GT
|  Anthony Beltoise
| rowspan=7| Audi R8 LMS Ultra
|-
|  Roland Bervillé
|-
|  Mike Parisy
|-
| rowspan=2|  Henry Hassid
|-
| rowspan=5| European Le Mans Series
|-
|  Mike Parisy
|-
|  Olivier Lombard
|-
|  Vincent Capillaire
| rowspan=2| Oreca 03 Nissan
|-
|  Jan Charouz
|-
| Mitjet 2L Supersport
|  Julien Fébreau
| Tork Mitjet 2.0 Renault
|}

Complete World Touring Car Championship results
(key) (Races in bold indicate pole position) (Races in italics indicate fastest lap)

Complete FIA World Rallycross Championship results
(key)

Supercar

2012 establishments in France
Auto racing teams established in 2012
French auto racing teams
European Le Mans Series teams
FIA GT Championship teams
24 Hours of Le Mans teams
Porsche Supercup teams
Sébastien Loeb
World Touring Car Championship teams
World Rallycross Championship teams
TCR International Series teams
Volkswagen in motorsport
World Rally Championship teams